Änglamark is a Swedish  song composed and written by Evert Taube for the movie The Apple War (Äppelkriget) in 1971.  The song is sung in the movie's opening and ending credits by the composer's son, Sven-Bertil Taube. Instrumental variations of the song are used as a leitmotif throughout the movie.

The original recording by Sven-Bertil Taube was on the Svensktoppen "Top 10"
for 16 weeks in 1972. In 2021, the song charted at number 18 on Sverigetopplistan's Heatseeker chart.
Since 1972 over 40 Cover versions of the song have been recorded.

Paul Britten Austin translated the lyrics into English and this version, "Where Angels Tread"", was recorded by Roger Whittaker in 1972

External links
Änglamark Lyrics  at genius.com

References 

Songs written by Evert Taube
Swedish songs
Environmental songs